The 1980 NCAA Division I-AA football season, part of college football in the United States organized by the National Collegiate Athletic Association at the Division I-AA level. The third season of I-AA football began in August 1980 and four teams were selected for the postseason, with the national semifinals played on December 13. The 1980 NCAA Division I-AA Football Championship Game was the Camellia Bowl played on December 20 at Hughes Stadium in Sacramento, California.

In a game with multiple lead changes, the Boise State Broncos won their first (and only) I-AA championship, defeating the defending national champion , 31−29. With less than a minute to play, the Broncos drove eighty yards for the winning touchdown, a 14-yard pass from quarterback Joe Aliotti to tight end Duane Dlouhy with twelve seconds remaining.

Conference changes and new programs

Conference standings

Conference champions

Postseason

NCAA Division I-AA playoff bracket
The bracket consisted of three regional selections (West, East, and South) plus Eastern Kentucky as an at-large selection.

* Denotes host institution

References